The Legend of the White Snake  is a Chinese legend. It may also refer to:
 The Legend of the White Snake (1956 film), 1956 Japanese film
 The Legend of the White Snake (1958 film), 1958 Japanese film
 The Legend of the White Snake (TV series), 2019 Chinese TV series

See also
 Madam White Snake (disambiguation)